Boukornine National Park is a national park in northern Tunisia.

The  park was established on 12 February 1987. It is very near to the town of Hammam-Lif and just  to the capital city of Tunis.

At the park, one can find flowers like the Persian cyclamen and animals like the Etruscan shrew (the world's smallest known mammal) and the Mountain gazelle.

The park is the site of Jebel Boukornine (a 576-metre mountain) and the Aïn Zargua spring, as well as an ecomuseum.

References

National parks of Tunisia
Protected areas established in 1987
IUCN Category II